Heteromastus is a genus of annelids belonging to the family Capitellidae.

The genus has cosmopolitan distribution.

Species:

Heteromastus caudatus 
Heteromastus filiformis 
Heteromastus filobranchus 
Heteromastus giganteus 
Heteromastus gusipoensis 
Heteromastus hutchingsae 
Heteromastus koreanus 
Heteromastus namhaensis 
Heteromastus similis 
Heteromastus tohbaiensis

References

Annelids